Kiepenheuer & Witsch is a German publishing house, established in 1948 by Joseph C. Witsch and on behalf of Gustav Kiepenheuer (who was already terminally ill).  The partners initially held respectively 30% and 40% of the company's share capital.   Kiepenheuer died in 1949, after which Witsch took over control and broke the original link with the existing Gustav Kiepenheuer Verlag (publishing house) in Weimar (which had ended up in the Soviet occupation zone).  For the Kiepenheuer & Witsch publishing business several years of major organisational restructuring followed.   The first books to be published under the Kiepenheuer & Witsch imprint was the novel Marion by Vicki Baum, which appeared in 1951.   In 1953 the firm acquired a new head office incorporating, for the first time, its own onsite publishing facilities, at Cologne-Marienburg.

Authors
Kiepenheuer & Witsch fiction authors include:

John Banville
Julian Barnes
Vicki Baum
Saul Bellow
Heinrich Böll
Breyten Breytenbach
Rolf Dieter Brinkmann
Michael Chabon
Don DeLillo
Bret Easton Ellis
Dave Eggers
Dario Fo
Jean Giono
Marek Hłasko
Nick Hornby
Christian Kracht
Jean-Marie Gustave Le Clézio
Czesław Miłosz
Gabriel García Márquez
Wilhelm Reich
Erich Maria Remarque
Joseph Roth
J. D. Salinger
Ignazio Silone
David Foster Wallace
Günter Wallraff
Feridun Zaimoglu

Nonfiction authors include:

Ralph Giordano
Joschka Fischer
Heiner Geißler
Carola Stern
Alice Schwarzer
Gerd Koenen
Necla Kelek
Patti Smith
Helmut Schmidt
Christoph Schlingensief
Ranga Yogeshwar

References 

Book publishing companies of Germany
Companies based in Cologne
Mass media in Cologne
Publishing companies established in 1951
1951 establishments in West Germany
Holtzbrinck Publishing Group
German companies established in 1951